Trogloneta is a genus of spurred orb-weavers that was first described by Eugène Louis Simon in 1922.

Species
 it contains twelve species, found in Europe, China, Japan, the United States, and Brazil:
Trogloneta canariensis Wunderlich, 1987 – Canary Is.
Trogloneta cantareira Brescovit & Lopardo, 2008 – Brazil
Trogloneta cariacica Brescovit & Lopardo, 2008 – Brazil
Trogloneta granulum Simon, 1922 (type) – Europe
Trogloneta madeirensis Wunderlich, 1987 – Madeira
Trogloneta mourai Brescovit & Lopardo, 2008 – Brazil
Trogloneta nojimai (Ono, 2010) – Japan
Trogloneta paradoxa Gertsch, 1960 – USA
Trogloneta speciosum Lin & Li, 2008 – China
Trogloneta uncata Lin & Li, 2013 – China
Trogloneta yuensis Lin & Li, 2013 – China
Trogloneta yunnanense (Song & Zhu, 1994) – China

See also
 List of Mysmenidae species

References

Araneomorphae genera
Mysmenidae
Spiders of Brazil
Spiders of China
Spiders of the United States